As part of the 2019 FIBA 3x3 World Cup held from June 18 to 23, 2019 in Amsterdam, Netherlands, three tournaments in addition to the main 3x3 men's and women's tournaments were contested. The Dunk contest was for men, the Skills contest for women, and the Shoot-out contest for both men and women.

Dunk contest

Qualification phase
Format
Each player competed in two rounds and four players with the highest score advances to the knockout stage. In a case of a tie, the tied players would have to perform again and in case they were still tied, the jury would have to decide the player who will advance through a majority decision.

Knockout stage
Two players will compete for three rounds instead of two.

Skills contest
The skills contest was contested by women players from the qualified 3x3 national teams of the main tournament. Each team can enter at most a single player for the competition. The contest which had a time limit of 45 seconds involves a qualification phase and a knockout round. The players begins on the starting line on the side of their choice. Upon a signal, the player must execute the following in order:
A corner shot
Pass a slalom through 4 cones while dribbling
A straight pass into a targe
Pass another slalom with 2 balls forward and then backwards
Another straight pass
Dribble through a slalom and score the basket

The four women with the best time record qualify for the knock-out round

Qualification phase

Knockout round

Shoot-out contest
The shoot-out contest is a mixed-gender competition with at most one male and one female player from 3x3 national teams participating in  the main tournaments.

Qualification phase
Format
Each player were to attempt 10 shots with every successful shot worth one point
Five from the right wing
Five from the left wing (45º angle from the baseline) and with a 30" shot clock.

Two male and two female players with the most points in the shortest amount of time advance to the final. In case of a tie or players scoring the same points within the same amount of time, the tied players were tasked to shoot again. The round concluded on June 11, 2018.
Men

Women

Final
Format
Players were to attempt 18 shots from four different locations:
Five from the right wing (45° angle from the baseline)
Five from the top of the arc
Five from the left wing (45° from the baseline)
Three from the 3x3 logo.
Shots made from the 3x3 are worth 2 points while the rest of the shots of are worth 1 point. The tiebreaker which was used in the qualification phase is used again for the final.

Results

References

Individual